Sugar Creek Township is a township in Harrison County, in the U.S. state of Missouri.

Sugar Creek Township took its name from Sugar Creek.

References

Townships in Missouri
Townships in Harrison County, Missouri